The following Union army units and commanders fought in the Battle of Cedar Mountain of the American Civil War. The Confederate order of battle is shown separately.

Military Rank Abbreviations Used
 MG = Major General
 BG = Brigadier General
 Col = Colonel
 Ltc = Lieutenant Colonel
 Maj = Major
 Cpt = Captain
 Lt = Lieutenant

Army of Virginia

Unattached units
Pope’s escort
1st Ohio Cavalry (detachment)

II Corps

MG Nathaniel Banks

Escort
1st Michigan Cavalry (detachment)
5th New York Cavalry (detachment)
1st Virginia Cavalry (detachment)

III Corps

MG Irvin McDowell

References
 Krick, Robert K.m Stonewall Jackson At Cedar Mountain, Chapel Hill: The University of North Carolina Press, 1990, .

American Civil War orders of battle